Bare Behind Bars (released in Brazil as A Prisão) is a 1980 sexploitation film directed and written by Oswaldo de Oliveira., The film, which was intended as a spoof of the common "women in prison" genre,  stars Maria Stella Splendore, Marta Anderson and Danielle Ferrite. The story concerns a group of lesbian inmates who are sexually abused by a sadistic female prison warden. The film features gratuitous nudity and sex scenes.

Plot
In a women's prison in Brazil, the inmates are young and beautiful, the warden is a sadist, all but one of the guards are cruel, and the nurse is incompetent. To make it difficult for the inmates to hide contraband, they wear no underwear. They are alternately murderous and orgiastic with each other, and they engage in sex play with some of the guards. The warden pimps out inmates to wealthy lesbians. With the help of the nurse and under the cover of Carnival, three inmates stage an escape. But once out they contrive to stay undiscovered as the authorities close in.

Cast
Maria Stella Splendore ... Sylvia - the prison warden 
Marta Anderson ... Barbara - the insane nurse
Danielle Ferrite ... Cynthia - Prisoner #341 
Neide Ribeiro ... Sandra - the assistant warden 
Márcia Fraga
Serafim Gonzalez 
Meiry Vieira ... Regular customer 
Sonia Regina 
Marliane Gomes 
Nadia Destro

Release
The film was banned by BBFC in the United Kingdom after independent film distributor Redemption Films attempted to distribute the film in 1994. It has since been released.

Home media
It was released on DVD by Blue Underground on 30 May 2006.

References

External links
Bare Behind Bars at IMDB

1980 films
Sexploitation films
Women in prison films
Brazilian LGBT-related films
LGBT-related controversies in film
Obscenity controversies in film
1980s erotic drama films
Films about child abuse
1980s exploitation films
Brazilian erotic drama films
1980 drama films